List of museums in France by location.

Auvergne-Rhône-Alpes

01 - Ain

 Ambérieu-en-Bugey
 Musée du cheminot
 Ars-sur-Formans
 Musée de cire du Curé d'Ars
 Bourg-en-Bresse
 Municipal Museum of Bourg-en-Bresse
 Musée départemental des Pays de l'Ain

03 - Allier
 Moulins
Musée de la Visitation
Centre National du Costume de Scene
 Montluçon
Château de La Louvière
Musée des Musiques Populaires

07 - Ardèche
 Annonay
 Musée vivarois

15 - Cantal

 Aurillac
 Musée d'art et d'archéologie

26 - Drôme

 Montélimar
 Musée du château des Adhémar
 Musée européen de l'aviation de chasse
 Palais des Bonbons et du Nougat
 Valence
 Musée des Beaux-Arts et d'Histoire Naturelle

38 - Isère

 Aoste
 Musée gallo-romain
 Champ-sur-Drac
 Musée Autrefois
 Échirolles
 Musée de la Viscose
 Musée Géo-Charles
 Grenoble
 Musée de l'Ancien Evéché
 Grenoble Archaeological Museum
 Musée dauphinois
 Museum of Grenoble
 Musée de la Résistance et de la Déportation à Grenoble
 Muséum d'histoire naturelle de Grenoble
 Le Magasin
 Musée des Troupes de Montagne
 Musée Stendhal
 Jarrie
 Musée de la Chimie
 La Côte-Saint-André
 Musée Hector Berlioz
 La Tronche
 Musée Hébert (La Tronche)
 Vienne
 Musée des Beaux-Arts et d'Archéologie 
 Musée du cloître de Saint-André-le-Bas 
 Musée archéologique Saint-Pierre 
 Musée de la Draperie  
 Vizille
 Musée de la Révolution française
 Vif
 Champollion Museum

42 - Loire

 Ambierle
 Musée Alice Taverne
 Saint-Étienne
 Musée d'art moderne
 Musée d'art et d'industrie
 Musée du vieux Saint-Étienne
 Musée de la mine
 Musée des transports urbains de Saint-Étienne et sa région
 L'Astronef
 Saint-Etienne Mine Museum
 Feurs
 Musée d'Assier

43 - Haute-Loire

 Le Puy-en-Velay
 Le Musée Crozatier
 Brioude
 Musée de la Dentelle
 Musée du Saumon
 Auvers
 musée de la résistance au Mont Mouchet
 Chavaniac-Lafayette
 Château de Chavaniac

63 - Puy-de-Dôme
 Ambert
 Moulin Richard de Bas
 Musée de la fourme
Arlanc
Musée de la dentelle à la main
 Clermont-Ferrand
 Musée d'art Roger Quilliot
 Musée du tapis et des arts textiles
 Musée Bargoin (archeology)
Lezoux
Musée départemental de la céramique de Lezoux
 Riom
 Musée Francisque Mandet
 Musée Régional d'Auvergne
Saint-Anthème
 Musée paysan de la Vallorgue
 Volvic
 Musée Marcel Sahut
 Musée Crozatier

69 - Rhône
 Beaujeu
 Musée des traditions populaires Marius Audin
 Lyon
 African Museum of Lyon
 Centre d'histoire de la résistance et de la déportation
 Musée des Beaux-Arts
 Musée d'art contemporain
 Musée gallo-romain de Lyon-Fourvière
 Musée des Confluences
 Muséum
 Musée des Tissus et des Arts décoratifs
 Musée Gadagne
 Musée de l'Imprimerie
 Musée Testut Latarjet d'anatomie
 Musée des Hospices civils de Lyon
 Musée de la miniature
 Musée d'histoire de la médecine et de la pharmacie
 Musée des Sapeurs Pompiers
 Poleymieux-au-Mont-d'Or
 Musée Ampère
 Rochetaillée-sur-Saône
 Musée de l'Automobile Henri Malartre
 Saint-Romain-en-Gal
 Musée gallo-romain de St-Romain-en-Gal
 Villefranche-sur-Saône
 Musée Paul Dini

73 - Savoie

 Aix-les-Bains
 Musée archéologique
 Faure Museum (Aix-les-Bains)
 Chambéry
 Musée des beaux-arts de Chambéry
 Musée des Charmettes
 Musée savoisien
 Muséum d'histoire naturelle
 Conflans
 Musée d'ethnographie et d'histoire

74 - Haute-Savoie

 Annecy
 Musée-château
 Château d'Annecy
 Palais de l'Isle
 Lovagny
 Château de Montrottier
 Les Gets
 Musée de la Musique mécanique
 Thonon-les-Bains
 Musée du Chablais
 Viuz-en-Sallaz
 Musée du paysan

Bourgogne-Franche-Comté

21 - Côte-d'Or

 Alise-Sainte-Reine
 Musée Alésia
 Auxonne
 Musée Bonaparte
 Beaune
 Collégiale Notre-Dame de Beaune
 Hôpital de la Sainte-Trinité dit hospice de la Charité de Beaune
 Musée des Beaux-Arts
 Musée Étienne-Jules Marey
 Musée de l’Hôtel-Dieu
 Musée du vin de Bourgogne
 Châtillon-sur-Seine
 Musée Archéologique
 Dijon
 Musée des Beaux-Arts
 Musée Archéologique
 Musée de la vie bourguignonne Perrin de Puycousin
 Musée Magnin
 Musée d'art sacré
 Muséum d’histoire naturelle
 Musée Rude
 Montbard
 Musée des Beaux-Arts
 Musée Buffon
 Nuits-Saint-Georges
 Musée municipal
 Saint-Jean-de-Losne
 Maison des mariniers
 Saulieu
 Musée François Pompon
 Savigny-lès-Beaune
 Musée Château de Savigny
 Semur-en-Auxois
 Musée municipal de Semur-en-Auxois

25 - Doubs
 Belvoir
 Musée du Chateau
 Besançon
 Hôpital Saint-Jacques
 Fonds régional d'art contemporain
 Musée Comtois
 Musée de la Résistance et de la Déportation
 Musée des Beaux-Arts et d'Archéologie
 Musée du Temps
 Musée lapidaire de l'Abbatiale Saint-Paul
 Museum d'Histoire Naturelle
 Montbéliard
 Musée Beurnier-Rossel
 Musée du Chateau
 Nancray
 Musée de Plein Air des Maison Comtoises
 Nans-sous-Sainte-Anne
 Taillanderie de Nans-sous-Sainte-Anne
 Ornans
 Musée Courbet (Gustave Courbet Museum)
 Pontarlier
 Musée Municipal
 Sochaux
 Musée Peugeot
 Valentigney
 Musée de la paysannerie et des vieux métiers

39 - Jura

 Arbois
 La Maison de Louis Pasteur
 Musée de la vigne et du Vin
 Musée Sarret de Grozon
 Bois-d'Amont
 Musée de la Boissellerie
 Champagnole
 Musée d'archéologie
 Dole
 Museum of Fine Arts, Dole
 Lons-le-Saunier
 Musée d'Archéologie
 Musée des Beaux-Arts
 Moirans-en-Montagne
 Musée du Jouet
 Morez
 Musée de la lunette
 Saint-Claude
 Musée des Beaux-Arts
 Salins-les-Bains
 Musée des Salines
 Musées des Techniques et Cultures Comtoises

58 - Nièvre

 Château-Chinon
 Musée du Costume
 Musée du Septennat
 Clamecy
 Musée Romain Rolland
 Cosne-sur-Loire
 Musée de la marine de Loire
 Nevers
 Musée municipal Frédéric Blandin
 Musée archéologique du Nivernais

70 - Haute-Saône
 Champlitte
 Musée Départemental Albert Demard
 Fougerolles
 Écomusée du Pays de la Cerise
 Gray
 Musée Baron Martin
 Haut-du-Them-Château-Lambert
 Musée Départemental de la Montagne Albert Demard
 Luxeuil-les-Bains
 Musée de la Tour des Échevins
 Musée du Combattant de la haute Saône
 Ronchamp
 Musée de la Mine de Ronchamp
 Vesoul
 Musée Georges Garret

71 - Saône-et-Loire

 Autun
 Musée Rolin
 Musée Lapidaire Saint-Nicolas
 Musée Verger-Tarin
 Cathédrale (salle capitulaire)
 Bourbon-Lancy
 Musée Saint-Nazaire
 Chalon-sur-Saône
 Musée Nicéphore Niépce
 Musée Vivant Denon
 Charolles
 Musée du Prieuré
 Musée René Davoine
 Cluny
 musée Ochier
 Dompierre-les-Ormes
 Galerie européenne de la forêt et du bois (European Gallery of forest and wood)
 Le Creusot
 Ecomusée de la Communauté Le Creusot Montceau
 Musée de l'homme et de l'industrie
 Mâcon
 Musée des Ursulines
 Musée Lamartine
 Marcigny
 Musée de la Tour et du Moulin
 Paray-le-Monial
 Musée eucharistique du Hiéron
 Pierre-de-Bresse
 Ecomusée de la Bresse Bourguignonne

89 - Yonne

 Auxerre

Muséum d’histoire naturelle

 Avallon

Musée du costume
 Noyers-sur-Serein
 
 

 Sens
 
 Vézelay
 
 Musée de la Pierre écrite
 Musée de l'Œuvre Viollet-le-Duc

90 - Territoire de Belfort

 Beaucourt
 Musée Frédéric Japy
 Belfort
 Musée d'Art et d'Histoire
 Collection d'Art Moderne «Maurice Jardot»
 Étueffont
 Forge-Musée d'Etueffont

Brittany

22 - Côtes-d'Armor
 Saint-Brieuc
 Musée d'Art et d'Histoire
 Dinan
 Musée du château
 Musée du Rail
 Lamballe
 Musée Mathurin-Méheut
Langueux
 Musée de la Briqueterie
Léhon
 Musée 39-45
Perros-Guirec
 Musée de cire
Pleumeur-Bodou
 Cité des télécoms
 La Poterie
 Musée de la Poterie

29 - Finistère

 Brest
Musée des Beaux-Arts de Brest
 Musée National de la marine de Brest (Site officiel du musée de la Marine)
 Océanopolis
 Tour Tanguy
 Camaret-sur-Mer
 Musée naval
 Concarneau
 Musée de la pêche
 Douarnenez
 Le Port-Musée
 Ergué-Gabéric
 Musée de l'Océanographie
 Morlaix
 Quimper
Pont-Aven
Musée des Beaux-Arts de Pont-Aven
 Musée Paul Gauguin
 Quimper
 Musée départemental breton
 Musée de l'alambic
 Musée des Beaux-Arts de Quimper

35 - Ille-et-Vilaine

 Baguer-Morvan
 Musée de la Paysannerie
 Cesson-Sévigné
 Musée des Transmissions
 Dol-de-Bretagne
 Cathédraloscope
 Lohéac
 Manoir de l'automobile
 Montfort-sur-Meu
 Ecomusée du pays de Montfort
 Rennes
 Musée des Beaux-Arts
 Musée de Bretagne
 Ecomusée de la Bintinais
 Vitré
 Musée Saint-Nicolas
 Musée du Château de Vitré
 Musée des Rochers-Sévigné
 Montreuil-sous-Pérouse
 Musée du Manoir de la Faucillonnaie

56 - Morbihan
 Baden
 Musée des Passions et des Ailes
 Carnac
 Musée de la Préshitoire
 Étel
 Musée des Thoniers
 Josselin
 Musée de Poupées
 Le Faouët
 Musée du Faouet
 La Gacilly
 le Végétarium Yves Rocher
 La Roche-Bernard
 Musée de la Vilaine maritime
 Lorient
 Musée de la compagnie des Indes
 Plouay
 Musée du vélo : Véloparc
 Port-Louis
 Musée de la Marine
 Saint-Marcel
 Musée de la Résistance bretonne
 Vannes
 Musée de la Cohue

Centre-Val de Loire

18 - Cher

 Bourges
 Musée Estève
 Palais Jacques Coeur
 Meillant
 Château-Musée Meillant
 Menetou-Salon
 Musée de Menetou-Salon

28 - Eure-et-Loir

 Chartres
 Centre International du Vitrail
 Musée des Beaux Arts de Chartres
 Illiers-Combray
 Musée Marcel Proust
 Mainvilliers
 Conservatoire de l'agriculture (Compa)

36 - Indre

 Azay-le-Ferron
 Château-musée
 Châteauroux
Musée Bertrand
Issoudun
 Musée de l'Hospice Saint-Roch
 Valençay
 Musée de l'automobile de Valençay
 Vatan
 Musée du cirque

37 - Indre-et-Loire

Amboise
 Musée de l'Hôtel de Ville
 Musée de La Poste
Azay-le-Rideau
 Château d'Azay-le-Rideau
Musée Maurice Dufresne
Tours
 Musée des Beaux-Arts de Tours
 Musée du Compagnonnage
 Château de Saché

41 - Loir-et-Cher

 Pontlevoy
 Musée du poids lourd
 Romorantin-Lanthenay
 Musée de la course automobile
 Blois
 Château de Blois
 La Maison de la Magie Robert-Houdin

45 - Loiret

 Beaugency
 Musée Daniel Vannier
 Briare
 Musée des deux marines
 Musée de la mosaïque et des Emaux de Briare
 Châteauneuf-sur-Loire
 Musée de la marine de Loire du Vieux-Châteauneuf et sa région
 Dampierre-en-Burly
 Musée de l'Illusion et du Cirque
 Gien
 Musée International de la Chasse
 Pithiviers
 Musée des transports

Corsica

2A - Southern Corsica

 Ajaccio
 Musée Fesch
 Musée des Milelli
 Musée napoléonien
 Musée national de la maison Bonaparte
 Levie
 Musée d'archéologie et d'ethnographie
 Sartène
 Musée départemental de préhistoire

2B - Upper Corsica

 Aléria
 Musée archéologique
 Departmental Museum of archaeology Gilort (Jérôme) Carcopino
 Bastia
 Musée d'ethnographie corse
 Corte
 Musée régional d'anthropologie
 Morosaglia
 Musée Pascal-Paoli

French Polynesia
Paul Gauguin Cultural Center
Paul Gauguin Museum (Tahiti)
Musée de Tahiti et des Îles
Robert Wan Pearl Museum

Grand Est

08 - Ardennes

 Bazeilles
 Maison de la dernière cartouche
 Mouzon
 Musée-Atelier Textile du Feutre
 Novion-Porcien
 Musée Guerre et Paix en Ardennes

10 - Aube

 Ricey
 Musée des vieux tacots
 Troyes
 Musée d'Art Moderne Donation Pierre et Denise Lévy
 Maison de l'Outil

51 - Marne (département)

 Reims
 Centre historique de l'automobile
 Palais du Tau

52 - Haute-Marne

 Bourbonne-les-Bains
 Musée Municipal d'Archéologie et de Peinture
 Chaumont
 Maison du Livre et de l'affiche
 Musée d'art et d'histoire
 Musée de la Crèche
 Langres
 Musée d'art et d'histoire

54 - Meurthe-et-Moselle
 Baccarat
 Musée de la cristallerie
 Jarville-la-Malgrange
 Musée de l'histoire du fer
 Lunéville
 Musée du château
 Nancy
 Muséum-Aquarium de Nancy
 Musée Lorrain
 Musée de l'École de Nancy (Art Nouveau)
 Musée des Beaux-Arts
 Saint-Nicolas-de-Port
 Musée français de la brasserie
 Musée du cinéma et de la photographie
 Toul
 Musée d'Art et d'Histoire
 Vannes-le-Châtel
 Cristallerie Daum
 Velaine-en-Haye
 Musée de l'automobile de Lorraine

55 - Meuse
Bar-le-Duc
 Musée Barrois
 Stenay
 Musée européen de la bière
 Verdun
 Centre mondial de la paix
 Musée de la Princerie

57 - Moselle
 Amnéville-les-Thermes :
 Musée de la moto et du vélo - classé Trésor national
 Aumetz et Neufchef :
 Musée des mines de fer de Lorraine
 Bitche :
 Musée de la Citadelle de Bitche
 Marsal :
 Musée départemental du sel
 Meisenthal :
Maison du verre et du cristal

 Metz :
 Museums of Metz
 Centre Pompidou-Metz
Petite-Rosselle
 Musée du Bassin Houiller Carreau Wendel
Sarreguemines
Musée de la Faïencerie
 Thionville :
Musée de la Tour aux Puces
Carreau Wendel Museum
 Vic-sur-Seille :
 Musée Georges de La Tour

67 - Bas-Rhin
 Albé
 Maison du Val de Villé
 Barr
 Musée de la Folie Marco
 Betschdorf
 Musée de la poterie
 Bischheim
 Musée rituel juif
 Bischwiller
 Maison des Arts
 Musée de la Laub
 Musée du centenaire (1888–1988)
 Bouxwiller
 Musée du Pays de Hanau
 Musée judéo-alsacien de Bouxwiller
 Brumath
 Musée archéologique
 Musée Gustave-Stoskopf
 Musée de l'hôpital psychiatrique
 Colroy-la-Roche
Musée d'apiculture
 Dambach-Neunhoffen
 Musée de la casemate Ligne Maginot
 Dehlingen
 Musée de Dehlingen, villa et jardin gallo-romains du Gurtelbach
 Dossenheim-sur-Zinsel
 Musée des arts et traditions populaires de Dossenheim-sur-Zinzel
 Refuge fortifié de Dossenheim-sur-Zinsel
 Drachenbronn-Birlenbach
 Musée de la fortification Maginot
 Erstein
 Musée Würth
 Etappenstall Maison du patrimoine
 Eschau
 Musée des traditions des arts populaires et de l'archéologie
 Geispolsheim
 Musée "Les secrets du chocolat"
 Gertwiller
 Musée du pain d'épices et de l'Art Populaire Alsacien
 Musée viti-vinicole
 Gottesheim
 Musée des arts et des traditions populaires
 Grandfontaine
 Musée de la mine de fer de Framont
 Musée du Framont (musée de la 2 CV Citroën)
 Graufthal
 Maison des Rochers de Graufthal
 Haguenau
 Musée alsacien (Haguenau)
 Musée historique de Haguenau
 Hatten
 Musée de la casemate Esch Ligne Maginot
 Musée de l'Abri Hatten Ligne Maginot
 Hochfelden
 Musée du pays de la Zorn
 Hunspach
 Fort de Schoenenbourg
 Klingenthal
 Maison de la manufacture d'armes blanches
 Kutzenhausen
 Maison rurale de l'Outre-Forêt
 La Petite-Pierre
 Musée des Arts et Traditions populaires de La Petite-Pierre
 Musée du sceau alsacien de La Petite-Pierre
 Lembach
 P'tit Fleck
 Ouvrage du Four à chaux Ligne Maginot
 Leutenheim
 Abri du Heidenbuckel
 Lichtenberg
 Château de Lichtenberg
 Marckolsheim
 Mémorial-Musée de la Ligne Maginot du Rhin
 Marmoutier
 Centre européen de l'Orgue Flûtes du Monde
 Musée d'arts et traditions populaires
 Merkwiller-Pechelbronn
 Musée français du pétrole
 Molsheim
 Musée de la Chartreuse et Fondation Bugatti
 Mutzig
 Fort de Mutzig
 Musée municipal
 Neuviller-la-Roche
 Musée des arts et traditions populaires de Neuviller
 Niederbronn-les-Bains
 Maison de l'archéologie des Vosges du Nord
 Obersteinbach
 Maison des châteaux-forts d'Obersteinbach
 Offendorf
 Musée de la batellerie Péniche Cabro
 Offwiller
 Maison d'Offwiller
 Orschwiller
 Château du Haut-Kœnigsbourg
 Pfaffenhoffen
 Musée de l'image populaire
 Ranrupt
 Musée de la scierie à Haut-Fer
 Reichshoffen
 Musée du fer, musée historique et industriel
 Reichstett
 Parc de la maison alsacienne
 Saint-Louis-lès-Bitche
 Musée du Cristal
 Sarre-Union
 Musée régional de l'Alsace Bossue
 Saverne
 Tour du télégraphe Chappe du Haut-Barr
 Musée du château des Rohan
 Schirmeck
 Mémorial de l'Alsace-Moselle
 Musée de la Côte du château de Schirmeck
 Sélestat
 Bibliothèque humaniste
 Maison du pain d'Alsace
 Seltz
 Musée Krumacker d'archéologie
 Strasbourg
 Cabinet des estampes et des dessins
 Musée Tomi Ungerer
 Musée alsacien
 Musée archéologique
 Musée d'art moderne et contemporain
 Musée de l’Œuvre Notre-Dame
 Musée des Arts décoratifs
 Musée des Beaux-Arts de Strasbourg
 Musée historique de Strasbourg
 Musée zoologique
 Musée de minéralogie
 Musée de sismologie et de magnétisme terrestre
 Naviscope Alsace
 Planétarium de Strasbourg
 Le Vaisseau
 Truchtersheim
 Maison du Kochersberg
 Uhlwiller
 Musée du pain
 Waldersbach
 Musée Jean-Frédéric Oberlin
 Wimmenau
 Maison de l'histoire et des traditions de la Haute-Moder
Wingen-sur-Moder
 Musée Lalique
 Wissembourg
 Musée Pierre Jost
 Musée Westercamp
 Wœrth
 Musée de la Bataille du 6 août 1870

68 - Haut-Rhin

 Altkirch
 Musée sundgauvien
 Cernay
 Musée de la Porte de Thann
Colmar
 Musée d'Unterlinden
 Musée Bartholdi
 Musée d'histoire naturelle et d'ethnographie
 Musée du jouet
 Musée des usines municipales
Guebwiller
Musée du Florival
 Muhlbach-sur-Munster
 Musée de la Schlitte et des métiers du bois
 Mulhouse
 Cité de l'automobile - Collection Schlumpf
 Musée Français du Chemin de Fer
 Électropolis
 Musée des Beaux-Arts de Mulhouse
 Musée historique de Mulhouse
 Musée de l'impression sur étoffe
Rixheim
 Musée du papier peint
Rouffach
Musée du bailliage de Rouffach
 Saint-Louis
 Musée d'art contemporain Fernet Branca

88 - Vosges
 Bains-les-Bains
Manufacture royale de Bains-les-Bains
 Bruyères
Musée Henri Mathieu, arts populaires
 Épinal
Musée du Chapitre, musée archéologique et historique
Musée de l'image, imagerie d'Épinal
Musée départemental d'Art ancien et contemporain
 Fontenoy-le-Château
 Broderie de Fontenoy-le-Château
Mirecourt
Musée de la lutherie
Musée de la Lutherie et de l'Archèterie françaises
 Remiremont
 Saint-Dié-des-Vosges
Musée Pierre-Noël de Saint-Dié-des-Vosges
 Saulcy-sur-Meurthe
Ferme-musée de la Soyotte
 Ville-sur-Illon
 Écomusée vosgien de la brasserie
 Vincey
 Musée militaire de Vincey
 Xonrupt-Longemer

Guadeloupe 

Terre-de-Haut Island, in the Îles des Saintes
 Fort Napoléon des Saintes

Hauts-de-France

02 - Aisne

 Blérancourt
 Musée de la Coopération franco-américaine
 Tergnier
Musée de la Résistance et de la Déportation de Picardie (Fargniers)

59 - Nord (département)

 Avesnes-sur-Helpe
 Musée de la Société d'archéologie
Bailleul
 Musée Benoît-de-Puydt
 Bergues
Musée municipal
Bousies
Musée des Évolutions
 Cambrai
 Musée de Cambrai
 Le Cateau-Cambrésis
 Musée Matisse
 Douai
 Musée de la Chartreuse
 Dunkirk
 Lieu d'Art et d'Action Contemporaine (LAAC)
 Musée des Beaux-Arts
 Musée portuaire
 Gravelines
 Musée du Dessin et de l'Estampe original
 Lille
 Palais des Beaux-Arts
 Centre d'art sacré contemporain
 Muséum d'histoire naturelle
 Maison de l'Architecture et de la Ville
 Musée des canonniers
 Hospice Comtesse
 Roubaix
 La Piscine, Musée d'art et d'industrie
 Manufacture des Flandres / Musée du Jacquard
 Tourcoing
 Musée des Beaux-Arts
 Verlaine Message Museum
 Valenciennes
 Musée des Beaux-Arts
 Villeneuve-d'Ascq
 Musée d'Art Moderne Lille Métropole

60 - Oise

 Beauvais
 Musée départemental de l'Oise
 Musée de la tapisserie
 Chantilly
 Musée Condé (2e musée de France par sa collection : peintures, gravures, dessins, manuscrits)
 Musée Vivant du Cheval
 Compiègne
 Musée du château de Compiègne
 Musée national de la voiture et du tourisme 
 Musée de la maquette
 Longueil-Annel
 La Cité des bateliers
Pierrefonds
 Château de Pierrefonds

62 - Pas-de-Calais

 Arras
 Musée des Beaux-Arts
 Carrière Wellington
 Béthune
Musée d'Ethnologie Régionale de Béthune
 Calais
 Musée des Beaux-Arts et de la Dentelle de Calais
 Étaples
 Musée d'Archéologie Quentovic
 Helfaut
 La Coupole
 Oignies
 Musée de la mine
 Saint-Omer
 Musée de l'hôtel Sandelin

80 - Somme

 Abbeville
 Musée Boucher de Perthes
 Albert
 Musée Somme 1916 aussi appelé "Musée des Abris"
 Amiens
 Musée de Picardie
 Collection Charles de l'Escalopier
 Musée de l'Hôtel de Berny
 Péronne
 Musée Municipal A. Danicourt
 Museum of the Great War

Île-de-France

75 - Paris

77 - Seine-et-Marne

 Barbizon
 Maison atelier Jean-François Millet
 Musée départemental de l'École de Barbizon
 Chelles
 Musée Alfred-Bonno
 Coulommiers
 Musée municipal des Capucins
 Égreville
 Jardin-musée Bourdelle d'Égreville
 Fontainebleau
 Musée de Fontainebleau
 Musée d'Art et d'Histoire Militaire
 Lagny-sur-Marne
 Musée Gatien-Bonnet
 Le Mée-sur-Seine
 Musée Chapu
 Longueville
 Dépôt-musée de Longueville
 Meaux
 Musée Bossuet
 Melun
 Musée de Melun
 Nemours
 Musée de Préhistoire d'Île-de-France
 Château-musée de Nemours
 Saint-Cyr-sur-Morin
 Musée départemental des Pays de Seine-et-Marne
 Vulaines-sur-Seine
 Musée départemental Stéphane Mallarmée

78 - Yvelines

 Conflans-Sainte-Honorine
 Musée de la batellerie
 Saint-Germain-en-Laye
 Musée Claude-Debussy
 Musée des Antiquités Nationales
 Musée départemental Maurice Denis "The Priory"
 Versailles
 Musée et domaine national des Châteaux de Versailles et de Trianon
 Public Establishment of the Palace, Museum and National Estate of Versailles
 Vicq
 International Museum of Naive Art

91 - Essonne

 Athis-Mons
 Musée Delta Athis Paray Aviation
 Bièvres
 Musée de la Photographie
Brunoy
Musée Robert Dubois-Corneau
 Évry
 Musée Paul Delouvrier
 La Ferté-Alais
 Aérodrome de Cerny
 Montgeron
 Musée Josèphe Jacquiot
 Palaiseau
 Musée du Hurepoix

92 - Hauts-de-Seine
 Boulogne-Billancourt
Musée des Années Trente
 Colombes
 Musée des transports urbains, interurbains et ruraux
 Issy-les-Moulineaux
 Musée Français de la Carte à Jouer
 Rueil-Malmaison
 Musée national du château de Bois-Préau
 Musée national du château de Malmaison
 Sceaux
 Musée de l'Île-de-France
 Sèvres
 Sèvres – Cité de la céramique

93 - Seine-Saint-Denis

 Le Bourget
 Musée de l'Air et de l'Espace
 Rosny-sous-Bois
 ROSNY-RAIL : Musée Régional du Chemin de Fer de Rosny-sous-Bois

94 - Val-de-Marne

 Champigny-sur-Marne
 Musée de la Résistance Nationale
 Maisons-Alfort
 Musée Fragonard
 Nogent-sur-Marne
 Musée de Nogent-sur-Marne
 Saint-Maur-des-Fossés
 Villa Médicis - Carré Médicis
 Vincennes
 Musée historique du donjon de Vincennes
 Vitry-sur-Seine
 Musée d'Art Contemporain du Val-de-Marne (Mac/Val)

95 - Val-d'Oise

 Argenteuil
 Musée d'Argenteuil
Butry-sur-Oise
 Musée des tramways à vapeur et des chemins de fer secondaires français
 Écouen
 Musée national de la Renaissance
 Guiry-en-Vexin
 Musée archéologique départemental du Val-d'Oise
 L'Isle-Adam
 Musée d'art et d'histoire Louis Senlecq
 Louvres
 Archéa
 Montmorency
 Musée Jean-Jacques Rousseau
 Pontoise
 Musée Tavet-Delacour
 Musée Pissarro

Normandy

 See List of museums in Upper Normandy

14 - Calvados

Avranches
 Musée de la 2nde guerre mondiale
 Arromanches-les-Bains
 Musée du débarquement
 Bayeux
 Mémorial du Général de Gaulle
 Musée Baron Gérard
 Musée de la Tapisserie de Bayeux
 Musée mémorial de la Bataille de Normandie
 Beaumont-en-Auge
 Musée Langlois
 Caen
 Musée des Beaux-Arts
 Musée de Normandie
 Mémorial pour la paix
 Musée de la Poste et des Télécommunications
 Courseulles-sur-Mer
 Juno Beach Centre
 Falaise
 musée août 1944
 Honfleur
 Musée Eugène Boudin - Musée de la marine
 Le Molay-Littry
 Musée de la meunerie
 Livarot
 Musée du fromage
 Ouistreham
 Musée du mur de l’Atlantique
 Pont-l'Évêque
 Musée de la belle époque de l'automobile
 Saint-Pierre-sur-Dives
 Musée des techniques fromagères
 Vieux
 Musée archéologique de Vieux-la-Romaine

27 - Eure

 Bernay
 Musée Municipal
 Giverny
 Musée des Impressionnismes (formerly Musée d'Art Américain)
 Musée Claude Monet
 Musée Baudy
 Vernon
 Musée Alphonse Georges Poulain

50 - Manche
 Avranches
 Le Scriptorial, Musée des Manuscrits du Mont-Saint-Michel
 Musée municipal
 Cherbourg-Octeville
 Musée Thomas Henry
 Muséum d'histoire naturelle d'archéologie et d'ethnographie
 Musée de la Libération
 Coutances
 Musée Quesnel Morinière
 Ger
 Musée Régional de la Poterie
 Granville
 Musée d'Art Moderne Richard Anacréon
 Musée Christian Dior
 Musée océanographique du Roc
 Gréville-Hague
 Maison natale Jean-François Millet
 Omonville-la-Petite
 Maison Jacques Prévert
 Regnéville-sur-Mer
 
 Saint-Lô
 Musée des Beaux-Arts et d'Histoire
Saint-Michel-de-Montjoie
 Parc-Musée du Granit
Saint-Vaast-la-Hougue
Musée maritime de l'Ile Tatihou
Sainte-Mère-Église
Musée Airborne
Ferme-musée du Cotentin
Réseau départemental des sites et musées de la Manche

61 - Orne

 Alençon
 Musée des Beaux-Arts et de la Dentelle
 Tourouvre
Maison de l'Émigration française au Canada
Flers
 Musée du Bocage normand.

76 - Seine-Maritime

 Caudebec-en-Caux
 Musée de la marine de Seine
 Duclair
 Musée août 44
 Le Havre
 Musée des Beaux-Arts André Malraux
 Montville
 Musée des Sapeurs-pompiers de France
 Notre-Dame-de-Bondeville
 Musée industriel de la corderie Vallois
 Rouen
 Musée départemental des antiquités
 Musée des Beaux-Arts
 Musée de la céramique
 Musée Flaubert et d'histoire de la médecine
 Muséum d'Histoire Naturelle de Rouen
 Musée Jeanne-d'Arc
 Musée Le Secq des Tournelles
 Maritime, Fluvial and Harbour Museum of Rouen
 Musée national de l'Éducation
 Gros Horloge
 Tour Jeanne d'Arc
 Lillebonne
 Musée de Lillebonne

Nouvelle-Aquitaine

16 - Charente

 Angoulême
 Musée des Beaux-Arts d'Angoulême
 Musée du papier
 Musée de la Bande Dessinée
 Musée de la société archéologique et historique de la Charente
 
 Cognac
 Musée d'Art et d'Histoire
 Musée des Arts du Cognac

17 - Charente-Maritime

 Île-d'Aix
 Musée national Africain
 Musée Napoléon
 Rochefort
 Musée naval
Saint-Martin-de-Ré, Île de Ré
Ernest Cognacq Museum

19 - Corrèze

 Brive-la-Gaillarde
 Musée Labenche
 Tulle
 Musée du Cloître de Tulle
 Sarran
 Musée du Président Jacques Chirac
 Ussel
 Musée du pays d'Ussel

23 - Creuse

 Aubusson
 Musée départemental de la tapisserie
 Guéret
 Musée d'Art et d'Archéologie de Guéret

24 - Dordogne

 Bergerac
 Mémorial de la Résistance
 Musée Donation Costi
 Musée du tabac
 Musée du Vin et de la Batellerie
 Cendrieux
 Château de la Pommerie : Musée Napoléon
 Groléjac
 Insectorama
 Les Eyzies-de-Tayac-Sireuil
 Musée national de Préhistoire
 Saint-Pardoux-la-Rivière
 Musée de la Carte postale en Périgord de 1898 à 1920.
 Sarlat
 Musée automobile
 Terrasson-Lavilledieu
 La Grange aux Dîmes de La Cassagne : Musée de lithographies, dessins et affiches de Sem

33 - Gironde

 Bordeaux
 Musée des Beaux-Arts
 Musée d'Art Contemporain
 Musée Goupil
 Musée National des douanes
 Muséum d'histoire naturelle de Bordeaux
 Musée des arts décoratifs de Bordeaux
 Musée d'Aquitaine
 Cadillac
 Musée de l'automobile de Cadillac
 La Réole
 Musées de la Réole
 Mérignac
 Conservatoire de l'air et de l'espace de la BA 116

40 - Landes

 Dax
 Musée de l'aviation légère de l'armée de Terre et de l'hélicoptère
 Musée de Borda
 Mont-de-Marsan
 Musée Despiau-Wlérick

47 - Lot-et-Garonne

 Agen
 Musée municipal
 Aiguillon
 Musée Raoul Dastrac
 Villeneuve sur Lot
 Musée de Gajac

64 - Pyrénées-Atlantiques
 Arudy
 Maison d'Ossau
 Bayonne
 Musée basque
 Musée Léon-Bonnat
 Musée basque et de l'histoire de Bayonne
 Biarritz
 Asiatica - Musée d'Art oriental
 Musée de la Mer
 Musée du chocolat
 Musée du Vieux-Biarritz
 Cambo-les-Bains
 Musée Arnaga - Demeure d'Edmond Rostand
 Guéthary
 Musée municipal Saraleguinea
 Hasparren
 Musée Francis Jammes
 Hendaye
 Musée d'Abbadie
 Morlanne
 Château de Morlanne
 Nay
 Musée du béret
 Orthez
 Musée Jeanne d'Albret
 Pau
 Musée national du château de Pau
 Musée Bernadotte
 Musée des Beaux-Arts
 Musée des parachutistes de Pau
 Musée de Pau ville anglaise
 Saint-Jean-de-Luz
 Musée Grévin
 Saint-Faust
 la Cité des Abeilles : musée consacré à l'abeille et à son environnement
 Salies-de-Béarn
 Musée du Sel
 Musée des arts et traditions béarnaises
 Sare
 Musée du gâteau basque

79 - Deux-Sèvres
 Oiron
 Château d'Oiron

86 - Vienne

 Châtellerault
 Musée auto, moto, vélo
 Civaux
 Musée archéologique de Civaux

87 - Haute-Vienne

 Châteauponsac
 Musée d'histoire et d'archéologie Réné Baubérot
 Limoges
 Musée de l'Évêché
 Musée national de Porcelaine Adrien Dubouché
 Rochechouart
 Musée Départemental d'Art Contemporain

Occitanie

09 - Ariège

 Foix
 Musée du château
 Lavelanet
 Musée du textile et du peigne en corne
 Luzenac
 Musée du talc
 Le Mas-d'Azil
 Musée de la préhistoire
 Niaux
 Musée pyrénéen
 Tarascon-sur-Ariège
 Parc Pyrénéen de l'art préhistorique

11 - Aude

 Limoux
 Musée Petiet
Carcassonne
Musée des Beaux-Arts de Carcassonne

12 - Aveyron

 Coupiac
 Musée de la marionnette
 Espalion
 Musée du Scaphandre
 Musée Joseph Vaylet
 Musée du Rouergue :
 Musée des Métiers de la Pierre et de la Vie rurale
 Musée archéologique départemental de Montrozier
 Musée des arts et métiers traditionnels
 Saint-Léons
 Micropolis (La Cité des Insectes)
 Rodez
 Musée Denys-Puech
 Musée Fenaille
 Musée Soulages

30 - Gard

 Alès
 Musée du colombier
 Bagnols-sur-Cèze
 Musée Albert-André
 Musée Léon-Alègre
 Nîmes
 Carré d'Art (Musée d'art contemporain)
 Musée archéologique
 Musée d'histoire naturelle
 Musée des Beaux-Arts
 Musée du Vieux Nîmes
 Pont-Saint-Esprit
Musée d'Art sacré du Gard
 Rousson
 Musée Le Préhistorama
 Uzès
 Musée de l'agriculture et de la locomotion
 Musée du bonbon

31 - Haute-Garonne

 Aurignac
 Musée de la Préhistoire
 Bagnères-de-Luchon
 Musée du pays de Luchon
 Martres-Tolosane
 Musée archéologique
 Muret
 Musée Clément Ader
 Saint-Gaudens
 Musée municipal d'Art et d'Histoire
 Saint-Frajou
 Musée de Peinture de Saint-Frajou
 Toulouse
 Musée Georges-Labit
 Musée des Augustins
 Museum d'Histoire Naturelle
 Musée d'art moderne et contemporain Les Abattoirs
 Le château d’eau, pôle photographique de Toulouse
 Cité de l'espace
 Hôtel d'Assézat (Fondation Bemberg)
 Musée du Vieux Toulouse
 Musée de l'Affiche
 Musée Départemental de la Résistance et de la Déportation
 Musée Saint-Raymond (Musée des Antiques de Toulouse)
 Musée Paul-Dupuy

32 - Gers

 Auch
 Musée des Jacobins
 Béraut
 Musée d'Art Naïf
 L'Isle-Jourdain
 Musée Européen d'Art Campanaire
 Lectoure
 Musée Eugène Camoreyt

34 - Hérault

 Agde
 Musée agathois Jules Baudou
 Musée de l'éphèbe
 Aniane
 Musée vivant du roman d'aventures
 Bédarieux
 Maison des arts
 Béziers
 Musée des Beaux-Arts
 Château de Raissac
 Musée du Biterrois
 Bouzigues
 Musée de l'Etang de Thau
 Musée du Sapeur Pompier
 Cabrières
 Les Vignerons de Cabrières
 Castelnau-le-Lez
 Centre Régional d'Histoire de la Résistance et de la Déportation
 Cazedarnes
 Musée de l'Abbaye de Fontcaude
 Cazouls-lès-Béziers
 Salle du Patrimoine
 Courniou
 Musée Français de la Spéléologie
 Cruzy
 Musée de Cruzy
 Faugères
 Ecomusée l'Oustal des Abeilles
 Fraisse-sur-Agout
 Pailher de Prat d'Alaric
 Frontignan
 Musée de Frontignan
 Gignac
 Musée de l'Hydraulique
 Hérépian
 Musée de la Cloche et de la Sonnaille
 Lattes
 Musée archéologique
 Lavérune
 Musée Municipal Hofer-Bury
 Le Crès
 Maison du Patrimoine
 Les Matelles
 Musée Municipal de Préhistoire
 Lodève
 Musée Fleury
 Loupian
 Chapelle Saint-Hippolyte
 Marseillan
 Musée de la Halle aux Oiseaux
 Marsillargues
 Musée Paul Pastre
 Magalas
 Espace Vins et Campanes
 Mèze
 Musée du Parc de la Plaine des Dinosaures
 Minerve
 Musée d'Archéologie et de Paléontologie du Minervois
 Musée Hurepel
 Montpellier
 Agropolis
 Musée Languedocien
 Musée Fabre
 Musée Empereur Antonin ou Musée des Moulages
 Musée d'Anatomie
 Musée de la Pharmacie
 Musée Atger
 Musée du vieux Montpellier
 Murviel-lès-Béziers
 Musée Archéologique
 Nissan-lez-Enserune
 Musée de l'Oppidum
 Musée Paroissial
 Olargues
 Musée d'Histoire Locale
 Olonzac
 Musée Archéologique du Minervois
 Palavas-les-Flots
 Musée Albert Dubout
Musée du Petit Train
 Pézenas
 Musée de Vulliod Saint-Germain
 Quarante
 Musée Archéologique
 Saint-Gervais-sur-Mare
 Maison Cévenole des Arts et Traditions Populaires
 Saint-Guilhem-le-Désert
 Musée Lapidaire
 Saint-Jean-de-Fos
 Vitrines de Poteries
 Saint-Pons-de-Thomières
 Musée de Préhistoire Régionale
 Sérignan
 Musée de l'Attelage et du Cheval
 Musée d'art contemporain
 Sète
 Musée Paul Valéry
 Espace Georges Brassens
 Viols-en-Laval
 Village Préhistorique de Cambous
 Viols-le-Fort
 Exposition permanente de préhistoire du pic Saint-loup

46 - Lot

 Cahors
 Musée Henri Martin
 Musée de la résistance, de la déportation et de la libération du Lot
Musée du vin et de la table Lotoise
 Figeac
 Musée Champollion

48 - Lozère
Albaret-Sainte-Marie
Plus petit musée du monde
Géoscope de l'aire de la Lozère
Banassac
Musée archéologique de Banassac
Châteauneuf-de-Randon
Musée du Guesclin
Javols
Musée archéologique de Javols
Langogne
Filature des Calquières
Musée d'art sacré
Le Pont-de-Montvert
Écomusée du mont Lozère
Saint-Chély-d'Apcher
Musée de la métallurgie
Musée des papillons

65 - Hautes-Pyrénées
 Bagnères-de-Bigorre
 Musée Salies

66 - Pyrénées-Orientales

 Céret
 Musée d'Art Moderne de Céret
 Collioure
 Musée d'Art Moderne Fonds Peské

81 - Tarn

 Albi
 Musée Toulouse-Lautrec
 Andillac
 Château-Musée du Cayla
 Castres
Musée Goya

82 - Tarn-et-Garonne

 Auvillar
 Musée du Vieil Auvillar
 Musée de la Batellerie
Ginals
Beaulieu-en-Rouergue Abbey, housing a museum of contemporary art
 Montauban
 Musée Ingres
 Musée d'Histoire Naturelle Victor-Brun
 Musée du Terroir
 Musée de la Résistance et de la Déportation
 Musée Marcel Lenoir

Pays de la Loire

44 - Loire-Atlantique

 La Baule
 Musée aéronautique de la Côte d'Amour
 La Planche
 Musée de la chanson française
 Le Loroux-Bottereau
 Musée de la Vigne et du Vin de l'Abbaye de Sainte-Radegonde
 Nantes
 Musée d'histoire de Nantes - Château des ducs de Bretagne
 Musée des Beaux-Arts
 Musée Dobrée (archéologie)
 Musée naval Maillé-Brézé (Site officiel)
 Musée Compagnonique
 Musée de l'imprimerie
 Jules Verne Museum
 Muséum d'histoire naturelle de Nantes
 Le Pallet
 Musée du vignoble Nantais
 Saint-Nazaire
 Écomusée de Saint-Nazaire

49 - Maine-et-Loire

 Angers
 Galerie David d'Angers
 Musée des Beaux-Arts
 Musée Jean Lurçat et de la tapisserie contemporaine
 Musée Régional de l'Air d'Angers-Marcé
 Muséum d'histoire naturelle d’Angers
 Musée du Génie militaire (Ouverture en 2008)
 Beaufort-en-Vallée
 Musée Joseph Denais
 Cholet
 Musée d'Art et d'Histoire
Montsoreau
Château de Montsoreau-Museum of Contemporary Art
Saint-Lambert-du-Lattay
Musée de la Vigne et du Vin d'Anjou
Saumur
Musée des Blindés
Musée du moteur
Trélazé
Musée de l'Ardoise

53 - Mayenne
 Ambrières-les-Vallées
 Musée des tisserands : history of chanvre, main culture in the Maine became Mayenne, in an authentic housse of tisserands from the 17th century.
 Beaulieu-sur-Oudon
 Musée de la moisson : tout le matériel ancien et l'ambiance des moissons d'autrefois.
 Château-Gontier
 Musée d'Art et d'Archéologie Hôtel Fouquet
 Chémeré-le-Roi
 Moulin de Thévalles : moulin à eau sur quatre niveaux, 1850.
 Cossé-le-Vivien
 Musée Robert Tatin
 Denazé
 Musée de la vieille forge : le métier de forgeron, in a house from the 17th century.
 Fontaine-Couverte
 Moulin des gués : moulin à vent de type angevin à 3 étages, 1824.
 Grez-en-Bouère
 Moulin de la Guénaudière : moulin cavier.
 Juvigné
 Musée du moteur et de l'outil à la ferme : sur plus de 1200 m2, plus de cent moteurs, tracteurs, batteuses... antérieurs aux années 1950.
 Lignières-Orgères
 Musée des moteurs et de l'outillage
 Madré
 Écomusée de Madré : une ferme mayennaise du début du siècle dernier.
 Melleray-la-Vallée
 Musée du cidre : la récolte, la transformation, la production, les outils d'hier et d'aujourd'hui.
 Renazé
 Musée de l'ardoise et de la géologie : sur l'ancien site ardoisier, toutes les étapes de l'exploitation autour d'un puits d'extraction.
 Saint-Ouën-des-Toits
 Musée de la chouannerie et de la Révolution : dans la "closerie des poiriers", l'ancienne maison de Jean Cottereau dit Jean Chouan, de la Choaunnerie et de la paysannerie de 1750 à 1850.
 Sainte-Suzanne
 Musée de l'auditoire : Sainte-Suzanne, cité médiévale, mille ans d'Histoire : maquettes, objets authentiques, armes du moyen-âge, et la plus ancienne armure conservée en France (1410–1420).
 Villaines-la-Juhel
 Musée du pot au lait : Conservatoire de la laiterie fermière d'antan

72 - Sarthe

 Le Mans
 Musée automobile de la Sarthe

85 - Vendée

 La Roche-sur-Yon
 Musée Municipal
 Musée SIMCA Yonnais
 Mouilleron-en-Pareds
 Musée des Deux Victoires - Clemenceau - De Lattre
 Les Sables-d'Olonne
 Musée de l'Abbaye Sainte-Croix
 Talmont-Saint-Hilaire
 Musée automobile de Vendée

Provence-Alpes-Côte d'Azur

04 - Alpes-de-Haute-Provence
 Barcelonnette
 Musée de la Vallée
Digne-les-Bains
Musée Alexandra David-Néel
 Digne-les-Bains
 Musée Alexandra David-Néel

05 - Hautes-Alpes

 Aiguilles
 Musée du Vieux Queyras

06 - Alpes-Maritimes

 Antibes
 Musée d'archéologie
 Musée naval et napoléonien
 Musée Peynet et du dessin humoristique
 Musée Picasso
Beaulieu-sur-Mer
 Villa grecque Kérylos Fondation Théodore Reinach
 Biot
 Musée national Fernand Léger
 Breil-sur-Roya
 Écomusée du haut-pays nicois
 Cagnes-sur-Mer
 Château musée Grimaldi
 Musée Renoir
 Cannes
 Musée de la Castre
 Musée de la Mer
 La Malmaison
 Grasse
 Musée d'Art et d'Histoire de Provence
 Musée international de la Parfumerie
 Musée de la Marine
 Villa Musée Jean-Honoré Fragonard
 Menton
 Jean Cocteau Museum
 Musée de préhistoire régionale
 Mougins
 Musée de l'automobile
 Musée d'Art Classique de Mougins
 Nice
 Musée d'art moderne et d'art contemporain
 Musée des arts asiatiques
 Musée des Beaux-Arts
 Musée international d'Art naïf Anatole Jakovsky
 Musée de la marine
 Musée Matisse
 Musée national Message Biblique Marc Chagall
 Musée de paléontologie humaine de Terra-Amata
 Muséum d'histoire naturelle
 Saint-Paul-de-Vence
 Fondation Maeght
 Tende
 Musée des Merveilles
 Vallauris
 Musée de la céramique
 Musée national Picasso « La Guerre et la Paix »
 Villefranche-sur-Mer
 Musée d'Art et d'Histoire
 Musée Volti
 Villeneuve-Loubet
 Musée Escoffier de l'art culinaire

13 - Bouches-du-Rhône
 Aix-en-Provence
 Musée Granet
 Atelier de Cézanne
 Musée Paul Arbaud
 Musée des tapisseries
 Musée de Pavillon de Vendôme-Dobler
 Musée du Vieil-Aix
 Museum d'Histoire Naturelle Aix-en-Provence
 Allauch
 Musée du vieil Allauch
 Aubagne
 Musée de la Légion étrangère
 Arles
 Musée de l'Arles et de la Provence antiques
 Museon Arlaten
 Musée Réattu
 Gréasque
 Musée de la Mine - Pôle Historique Minier
La Barque
 Musée provencal des transports de La Barque
 Marseille
 Musée d'archéologie méditerranéenne
 Musée d’Arts Africains, Océaniens, Amérindiens
 Musée d'art contemporain de Marseille
 Musée des Beaux-Arts
 Mémorial des camps de la mort
 Musée des Civilisations de l'Europe et de la Méditerranée
 Musée Cantini
 Musée des docks romains
 Musée de la faience
 Mémorial national de la France d'outre-mer
 Musée Grobet-Labadié
 Marseille History Museum
 Muséum d'histoire naturelle de Marseille
 Musée de la Marine
 Musée de la Mode
 Musée de la moto
 Musée du Santon
 Galerie des Transports
 Musée du Vieux Marseille
 Martigues
 Musée Ziem
 Mallemort
 Musée des engins du batiment et des travaux publics
 Puyloubier
 Musée de l'uniforme légionnaire

83 - Var

 Bendor
Universal Exposition of Wines and Spirits
Ricard Museum of Advertising Objects
 Embiez
Paul Ricard Oceanographic Institute
 Saint-Cyr-sur-Mer
 Musée gallo-romain de Tauroentum
 Saint-Tropez
 Musée de l'Annonciade
 Musée d'Archéologie sous-marine
 Sanary-sur-Mer
 Musée Frédéric Dumas
 Toulon
 Musée d'Art
 Musée des arts asiatiques
 Musée national de la Marine

84 - Vaucluse

 Apt
 Cathédrale Sainte-Anne
 Musée d'histoire et d'archéologie
Avignon
 Fondation Calvet
 Musée lapidaire
 Musée Requien
 Palais des Papes
 Carpentras
 Musée Comtadin-Duplessis
 Musée Sobirats
Fontaine-de-Vaucluse
 Musée d'histoire 1939-1945 - L'Appel de la Liberté

See also

See also 
 Tourism in France
 Culture of France

Sources 

Guide Dexia of the 10 000 museums and private collections in France, Dom-Tom, Andorre et Monaco by Alain Morley 	and Guy le Vavasseur, Cherche-Midi Editeur, 2001

References

External links 
 
 

 
Museums